Eradu Kanasu may refer to:
 Eradu Kanasu (novel), a Kannada-language novel by Vani
 Eradu Kanasu (1974 film)
 Eradu Kanasu (2017 film)